The Orthodox Church of the Holy Spirit is a Russian Orthodox church in the Vilnius Old Town, capital of Lithuania, rebuilt 1749–1753 in the Vilnian Baroque style. It should not be confused with the Roman Catholic Church of the Holy Spirit in Vilnius.

History
The site of the present church used to be occupied by a wooden church, following the form a Latin cross, erected in 1638, when Vilnius was part of the Polish–Lithuanian Commonwealth. Associated with the church was a convent, opened in 1567.

After a fire gutted the wooden church in the 18th century, a stone church was erected in 1749–1753 in the Baroque style, with details of the interior in Roccoco style. It was designed by Johann Christoph Glaubitz, an architect of German descent who was noted for developing a Lithuanian school of Baroque architecture, known as Vilnian Baroque.

Architecture
In the 19th century, when Vilnius was part of the Russian Empire, several Byzantine Revival architectural elements were added to the church, but it nevertheless retained its essentially Baroque form. Indeed, the added Orthodox frescoes, Iconostasis and dome enhanced its magnificence, as did the addition of deep blue and green interior decor. Unusual in an Orthodox church are the Scagliola (simulated marble) sculptures. A new reliquary was added in 1853.

In the crypt lie the remains of Saints Anthony, John, and Eustathios. A tradition of the church is to cloak them in black during Lent, in white at Christmas and in red on other major religious holidays.

Present
The Church of the Holy Spirit is the major Orthodox church in Lithuania, and it is affiliated with two Orthodox monasteries: The Monastery of the Holy Spirit and the Convent of Saint Mary Magdalen. These are the only remaining Orthodox monasteries in Lithuania.

Gallery

References

External links 

 Vilnius Tourism 
 inyourpocket.com

Eastern Orthodox churches in Lithuania
Churches in Vilnius
18th-century Eastern Orthodox church buildings
Church buildings with domes
18th-century churches in Lithuania